Damián Vindel Marín (born 5 May 1981 in Lleida) is a Spanish canoe sprint canoer who competed in the mid-2000s. At the 2004 Summer Olympics in Athens, he finished sixth in the Canoeing at the 2004 Summer Olympics – Men's K-2 500 metresK-2 500 m event.

References
 Sports-Reference.com profile

1981 births
Canoeists at the 2004 Summer Olympics
Living people
Olympic canoeists of Spain
Spanish male canoeists
Mediterranean Games silver medalists for Spain
Mediterranean Games medalists in canoeing
Competitors at the 2005 Mediterranean Games
21st-century Spanish people